Planète Sciences is a French voluntary association founded in 1962 dedicated to the sciences.

The organization organizes the Coupe de France de robotique and Eurobot, an international amateur robotics contest

External links
 Planète Sciences 

Scientific organizations based in France
Scientific organizations established in 1962
1962 establishments in France